Gilmore station is an elevated Manila Light Rail Transit (LRT) station situated on Line 2. It is located near Gilmore Avenue, Quezon City in Mariana, Quezon City.  It is named after the nearby Gilmore Avenue, which in turn is named for Eugene Allen Gilmore, Vice Governor-General of the Philippines from 1922 to 1929 who twice served as acting Governor-General of the Philippines.

The station is the sixth station for trains headed to Antipolo and the eighth station for trains headed to Recto.

Nearby landmarks
The most recognizable landmarks closest to the station are SYKES Asia, Inc. (K-Pointe site), Saint Paul University Quezon City, Aurora Garden Plaza, Gilmore I.T. Center, and Robinsons Magnolia. The station is also the closest station for passengers heading to Saint Joseph's College of Quezon City, St. Luke's Medical Center, Our Lady of Mount Carmel Parish, Broadway Centrum, and Trinity University of Asia, formerly Trinity College of Quezon City. San Juan and Greenhills Shopping Center are also accessible from this station, as Gilmore connects with Sen. Jose O. Vera Street (more popularly known as Granada Street) leading to Ortigas Avenue where Xavier School and Immaculate Conception Academy-Greenhills are located.

Transportation links
Buses, taxis, jeepneys, and tricycles can be used for onward journeys.

Gallery

See also
 Manila Light Rail Transit System Line 2

References

Manila Light Rail Transit System stations
Railway stations opened in 2004
Buildings and structures in Quezon City